Smart's and Prey Heaths is a  biological Site of Special Scientific Interest south-west of Woking in Surrey.

These mainly damp heaths are dominated by ling, cross-leaved heath and purple moor-grass. Other plants include creeping willow, dwarf gorse,  oblong-leaved sundew, deergrass and round-leaved sundew.

The heaths are crossed by footpaths.

References

Sites of Special Scientific Interest in Surrey